Pseudolaubuca hotaya is a species of freshwater ray-finned fish from the family Cyprinidae, the carps and minnows from south east Asia. It occurs in northern Vietnam.

References

Cyprinid fish of Asia
Pseudolaubuca
Fish described in 1978